Le Nouvelliste is the Mauricie regional newspaper, based in Trois-Rivières, Quebec. It is part of the Gesca media conglomerate. It was part of the Parizeau Affair, a political affair of the 2003 Quebec general election.

See also 
List of Quebec media
List of newspapers in Canada

References

External links
Official website

French-language newspapers published in Quebec
Gesca Limitée publications
Mass media in Trois-Rivières
Daily newspapers published in Quebec
Publications with year of establishment missing